"I'm with You" is a song by Canadian singer-songwriter Avril Lavigne from her debut studio album Let Go (2002). It was released to radio as the third single from the album on November 18, 2002, by Arista Records. The song was written by Lavigne and the production team the Matrix, who solely helmed its production. According to Lavigne, the song was inspired by feelings of loneliness she experienced over being single.

The song reached number four on the US Billboard Hot 100 and reached the top 10 in nine other countries, including Ireland, Italy, and New Zealand, peaking within the top five in these regions. In the US, the song topped two Billboard listings: the Adult Top 40 and the Mainstream Top 40. "I'm with You" received radio and television airplay in Australia, but it was not officially released there. The track was nominated for several awards following its release, winning two ASCAP Awards, a BMI Pop Music Award, and a SOCAN Award. It was the second Lavigne song to be nominated for a Grammy in the categories Song of the Year and Best Female Pop Vocal Performance at the 46th Annual Grammy Awards.

Background and composition
"I'm with You" was written by Lavigne and the production team the Matrix. According to Lavigne, the song was written when she was having a "depressing day" due to feelings of loneliness over being single.

"I'm with You" is a rock song. According to the sheet music published at Musicnotes.com by Alfred Publishing, the song is written in the key of A major and is set in a  time signature with a tempo of 56 beats per minute. Lavigne's vocal range spans two octaves, from A3 to E5.

Critical reception
Billboard senior editor Chuck Taylor referred to the song as a "beautifully performed, musically sophisticated outing that showcases a surprisingly emotional vocal from [Lavigne]." He further praised the song's universal appeal, believing that its theme relates well to both teenagers and adults. Sal Cinquemani of Slant Magazine described the song as "sweet." Jamieson Cox of Pitchfork described the song as a power ballad and compared it to B-sides released by American rock band Aerosmith in the late Nineties.

The arrangement of singles from Let Go, with "I'm with You" as the third, was regarded as "controversial choices", given that "I'm with You" was "thought by some to be the biggest potential smash on the album", and could have established Lavigne as a more mature artist if it was released first. According to Reid, "Some people just really didn't get that. And with the first video, there was some concern that maybe because it's so young and so playful, it might alienate more serious music lovers." KidsWorld called it "the perfect song to drown your sorrows to when that guy from your class breaks your heart."

Chart performance
"I'm with You" became Lavigne's third top 10 song when it peaked at number four on the Billboard Hot 100 in 2003 during its ninth week on the chart. The song spent 10 consecutive weeks on the top 10 and 27 weeks on the Hot 100 making it Lavigne's second-longest staying song on this chart, surpassed by her debut single "Complicated" which stayed on the chart for 31 weeks. "I'm with You" ranked at number 18 on the Billboard Year-End Hot 100 singles of 2003 and number 13 on the Canadian Singles Chart. The song was certified gold by Recording Industry Association of America in 2006 for sales of over 500,000 copies in the United States. As of July 2013, "I'm with You" had sold 556,000 digital copies in the US. As a double A-side DVD single, the "I'm with You"/"Sk8er Boi" video single was certified gold and platinum in 2003.

In United Kingdom, "I'm with You" was released on March 31, 2003. The song debuted and peaked at number seven on the UK Singles Chart in 2003, becoming her third top 10 single on the chart; the song re-entered in UK Singles Chart in the week of December 17, 2011, in number 58. It debuted at number six and peaked at number five in Ireland, staying in the top 10 for six weeks. "I'm with You" reached top five in New Zealand; top 10 in Belgium and the Netherlands; top 20 in Sweden, Switzerland, Austria, Germany, Norway and Denmark as well as reaching the top 40 in France. The song re-entered the UK Singles Chart on December 10, 2011, at number 58, almost 10 years after the song first charted.

Music video

Background
The music video was directed by David LaChapelle in Los Angeles, California. Filmed in November 2002, most of the video is shown in slow motion but Lavigne's mouth movements are in sync with the song's vocals. This was achieved by recording the footage while the song was played twice as fast. It was at least partly filmed in Los Angeles. The street shots were filmed on Broadway, and the Orpheum Theatre is seen.

Synopsis and reception

The video depicts Lavigne, who is seen alone, trying to find someone, whilst her band members play the song alone in the streets. Showing her originally at a party, the video also sees Lavigne pushing a guy when he tries to get with her straight after making out with another woman. The video also sees Lavigne walking on the streets and wearing a black jacket. Through the video, she is seen standing behind a snowy bank. At the end of the video, Lavigne walks out of the club with her coat on, kicks out the door and walks away. 

Much Music named the video one of the "Top 100 Best Videos of All Time". The music video was originally meant to end with Lavigne walking out of the club to her bandmates, who then greet her and walk off together into the distance, but this ending was removed during post-production, ending the video with her leaving alone. An alternative version of the video leaked online to the internet, comprising alternate shots, slightly longer sequences and featuring the originally filmed ending.

Accolades
"I'm with You" was nominated for the 2004 Grammy Award for Song of the Year, and for Best Female Pop Vocal Performance but lost to Luther Vandross's "Dance with My Father" and Christina Aguilera's "Beautiful" respectively.

In media, covers and samples
"I'm with You" was later featured in the season 3 Scrubs episode "My Tormented Mentor", in the Smallville episode "Accelerate" and in the movie Bruce Almighty. The song was also used in the 2003 Brazilian soap opera Mulheres Apaixonadas. Furthermore, it was featured in the video game Karaoke Revolution Volume 2 and in Singstar Rock Ballads. The song is also used as the background music for the Panasonic Lumix DMC-G85/G80 commercial, with Jennifer Garner and Cate Blanchett.

Rihanna sampled the song on her track "Cheers (Drink to That)", which was released as a single. Lavigne made an appearance in the music video. Polish-Czech singer Ewa Farna covered the song and it was featured as a track on her album Měls mě vůbec rád.

Sophie Evans covered the song in Week 3 of Over the Rainbow. A year later, Amelia Lily covered the song in Week 9 of series 8 of The X Factor.

British singer Yungblud covered the song as part of his segment for BBC Radio 1's annual Live lounge month. He mashed-up the song with Taylor Swift's "Cardigan" (2020), accompanying himself on an acoustic guitar, joined by a cellist and two violinists, resulting in a cheerful, strings-laden performance. Both artists responded to the medley affirmatively.

Track listings and formats
 CD single
 "I'm with You" (album version) – 3:44
 "I'm with You" (live version) – 3:57
 Cassette and maxi single
 "I'm with You" (album version) – 3:44
 "I'm with You" (live) – 3:57
 "Unwanted" (live) – 4:01
 DVD single
 "I'm with You" 
 "Sk8er Boi" 
 "Behind-the-Scenes Footage" 
 "Let Go TV Spots"

Credits and personnel
Credits and personnel are adapted from the Let Go album liner notes.
 Avril Lavigne – writer, lead vocals
 The Matrix – writer, producer, arrangement, recording, additional vocals
 Tom Lord-Alge – mixing
 Femio Hernandez – mixing assistant
 Corky James – guitars
 Suzi Katayama – cello

Charts

Weekly charts

Year-end charts

All-time charts

Certifications

Release history

References

External links
 "I'm with You" music video on Vevo via YouTube
 Avril Lavigne's official site

2000s ballads
2002 songs
2002 singles
Avril Lavigne songs
Record Report Pop Rock General number-one singles
Music videos directed by David LaChapelle
Rock ballads
Song recordings produced by the Matrix (production team)
Songs written by Avril Lavigne
Songs written by Lauren Christy
Songs written by Graham Edwards (musician)
Songs written by Scott Spock
Arista Records singles
Pop ballads
Songs about suicide